Eucosma morrisoni, or Morrison's mosaic, is a species of moth of the family Tortricidae described by Thomas de Grey, 6th Baron Walsingham in 1884. It is found in western states North America and from Washington east to Michigan. The species is listed as threatened in the US state of Connecticut.

The length of the forewings is 7.3-10.5 mm. The forewings are ochreous and fuscous with white streaks and blotches. Adults are on wing from June to August.

Etymology
The species is named in honour of professional insect collector Herbert Knowles Morrison.

References
 

Eucosmini
Moths described in 1884